The Insider is a 1999 American drama film directed by Michael Mann, from a screenplay adapted by Eric Roth and Mann from Marie Brenner's 1996 Vanity Fair article "The Man Who Knew Too Much". It stars Al Pacino and Russell Crowe, with supporting actors including Christopher Plummer, Bruce McGill, Diane Venora and Michael Gambon.

A fictionalized account of a true story, it is based on the 60 Minutes segment about Jeffrey Wigand, a whistleblower in the tobacco industry, covering his and CBS producer Lowell Bergman's struggles as they defend his testimony against efforts to discredit and suppress it by CBS and Wigand's former employer.

Though not a box office success, The Insider received acclaim from critics, who praised Crowe's portrayal of Wigand, and Mann's direction. It was nominated for seven Academy Awards, including Best Picture and Best Actor in a Leading Role (for Russell Crowe).

Plot
During a prologue, a CBS producer, Lowell Bergman, convinces the founder of Hezbollah, Sheikh Fadlallah, to grant an interview to Mike Wallace for 60 Minutes. While preparing for the interview, both Wallace and Bergman firmly stand their ground against the Sheikh's armed and hostile bodyguards' attempted intimidation and disruption.

Later, Bergman approaches Jeffrey Wigand—a former executive at the Brown & Williamson tobacco company—for help explaining technical documents. Wigand agrees, but intrigues Bergman when he adds that he won’t discuss anything else, citing a confidentiality agreement. B&W later coerce Wigand into a more restrictive agreement, leading Wigand to accuse Bergman of having betrayed him. Bergman subsequently visits Wigand to defend himself and investigate the potential story. Wigand, though apparently possessing very damaging information, is hesitant to jeopardize his severance package with B&W by revealing anything.

Wigand's family move into a more modest house, and Wigand begins working as a teacher. One night Wigand finds evidence of trespass, and receives a sinister phone call. Meanwhile, Bergman contacts Richard Scruggs, an attorney representing Mississippi in a lawsuit against the tobacco industry, suggesting that if they deposed Wigand, it could negate his confidentiality agreement and give CBS cover to broadcast the information; Scruggs expresses interest. Some time later, Wigand receives an emailed death threat and finds a bullet in his mailbox. He contacts the FBI, but the agents who visit him are hostile and confiscate his computer. A furious Wigand demands that Bergman arrange an interview, in which Wigand states that he was fired after he objected to B&W intentionally making their cigarettes more addictive.

Bergman later arranges a security detail for Wigand's home, and the Wigands suffer marital stress. Wigand testifies in Mississippi, over the objections of B&W attorneys, despite having been served with a gag order. On returning home, he discovers that his wife Liane has left him and taken their daughters. Eric Kluster, the president of CBS News, decides not to broadcast Wigand's interview, after CBS legal counsel Helen Caperelli warns that the network is at risk of legal action from B&W. Bergman confronts Kluster, believing that he is protecting the impending sale of CBS to Westinghouse, which would enrich both Kluster and Caperelli. Wallace, and their executive producer Don Hewitt, both side with Kluster. Wigand, learning of this, is appalled, and terminates contact with Bergman.

Investigators probe Wigand's personal history and publish their findings in a 500-page dossier. Bergman learns that The Wall Street Journal intends to use it in a piece questioning Wigand's credibility. He convinces the editor of the Journal to delay while Jack Palladino, an attorney and investigator, evaluates it. After infighting at CBS over the Wigand segment, Bergman is ordered to take a "vacation", as the abridged 60 Minutes segment airs. Bergman contacts Wigand, who is both dejected and furious, accusing Bergman of manipulating him. Bergman defends himself and praises Wigand and his testimony. Scruggs urges Bergman to air the full segment to draw public support for their lawsuit, itself under threat by a lawsuit from Mississippi's governor. Bergman is unable to assist, and privately questions his own motives in pursuing the story.

Bergman contacts an editor at The New York Times, disclosing the full story and events at CBS. The Times prints the story on the front page, and condemns CBS in a scathing editorial. The Journal dismisses the dossier as character assassination and prints Wigand's deposition. Hewitt accuses Bergman of betraying CBS, but finds that Wallace now agrees that bowing to corporate pressure was a mistake. 60 Minutes finally airs the original segment, including the full interview with Wigand. Bergman tells Wallace that he has resigned, believing 60 Minutes's credibility and integrity is now permanently tarnished.

Cast

 Al Pacino as Lowell Bergman
 Russell Crowe as Dr. Jeffrey Wigand
 Christopher Plummer as Mike Wallace
 Diane Venora as Liane Wigand
 Philip Baker Hall as Don Hewitt
 Lindsay Crouse as Sharon Tiller
 Debi Mazar as Debbie De Luca
 Renee Olstead as Deborah Wigand
 Hallie Kate Eisenberg as Barbara Wigand
 Stephen Tobolowsky as Eric Kluster
 Colm Feore as Richard Scruggs
 Bruce McGill as Ron Motley
 Gina Gershon as Helen Caperelli
 Michael Gambon as B&W CEO Thomas Sandefur
 Rip Torn as John Scanlon
 Cliff Curtis as Sheikh Fadlallah
 Gary Sandy as Sandefur's lawyer
 Roger Bart as Seelbach hotel manager
 Jack Palladino as himself
 Mike Moore as himself

Production

With a budget set at $68 million, Mann began collecting a massive amount of documents to research the events depicted in the film: depositions, news reports and 60 Minutes transcripts. He had read a screenplay that Eric Roth had written, called The Good Shepherd, about the first 25 years of the CIA. Based on this script, Mann approached Roth to help him co-write The Insider. Mann and Roth wrote several outlines together and talked about the structure of the story. Roth interviewed Bergman numerous times for research and the two men became friends. 

After he and Mann wrote the first draft together at the bar at the Broadway Deli in Santa Monica, Roth met Wigand. The whistleblower was still under his confidentiality agreement and would not break it for Roth or Mann. Roth's initial impressions of Wigand were that he came across as unlikable and defensive. As they continued to write more drafts, the two men made minor adjustments in chronology and invented some extraneous dialogue but also stuck strictly to the facts whenever possible. However, Mann and Roth were not interested in making a documentary.

Val Kilmer was considered by Mann for the role of Jeffrey Wigand. Producer Pieter Jan Brugge suggested Russell Crowe and after seeing him in L.A. Confidential, Mann flew Crowe down from Canada where he was on location filming Mystery, Alaska on the actor's one day off and had him read scenes from The Insider screenplay for two to three hours. When Crowe read the scene where Wigand finds out that the 60 Minutes interview he did will not be aired, he captured the essence of Wigand so well that Mann knew he had found the perfect actor for the role. Crowe, who was only 33 years old at the time, was apprehensive at playing someone much older than himself when there were so many good actors in that age range. 

Once Crowe was cast, he and Mann spent six weeks together before shooting began, talking about his character and his props, clothes and accessories. Crowe was not able to talk to Wigand about his experiences because he was still bound by his confidentiality agreement during much of the film's development period. To get a handle on the man's voice and how he talked, Crowe listened repeatedly to a six-hour tape of Wigand.

Al Pacino was Mann's only choice to play Lowell Bergman. He wanted to see the actor play a role that he had never seen him do in a movie before. Pacino, who had worked with Mann previously in Heat, was more than willing to take on the role. To research for the film, Mann and Pacino hung out with reporters from Time magazine, spent time with ABC News and Pacino actually met Bergman to help get in character.

Pacino suggested Mann cast Christopher Plummer in the role of Mike Wallace. Pacino had seen the veteran actor on the stage many times and was a big fan of Plummer's work. Mann had also wanted to work with Plummer since the 1970s. Pacino told Mann to watch Plummer in Sidney Lumet's Stage Struck (1958), and afterwards he was the director's only choice to play Wallace—Plummer did not have to audition. He met with Mann and after several discussions was cast in the film.

For the scene in which the deposition hearing takes place, the filmmakers used the actual courtroom in Pascagoula, Mississippi, where the deposition was given.

Accuracy

The Insider was adapted from "The Man Who Knew Too Much", an influential article on tobacco industry whistleblower Jeffrey Wigand, written by journalist Marie Brenner for the May 1996 issue of Vanity Fair.

Mike Wallace said that two-thirds of the film was quite accurate, but he disagreed with the film's portrayal of his role in the events; in particular, he objected to the impression that he would have taken a long time to protest CBS's corporate policies.

Release

Box office
The Insider was released in 1,809 theaters on November 5, 1999, where it grossed a total of $6,712,361 on its opening weekend and ranked fourth in the country for that time period. It went on to make $29.1 million in North America and $31.2 million in the rest of the world for a total of $60.3 million worldwide, significantly lower than its $90 million budget. The film was considered to be a commercial disappointment. Disney executives had hoped that Mann's film would have the same commercial and critical success as All the President's Men, a film in the same vein. 

However, The Insider had limited appeal to younger moviegoers (studio executives reportedly said the prime audience was over the age of 40) and the subject matter was "not notably dramatic," according to marketing executives. Then-Disney chairman Joe Roth said, "It's like walking up a hill with a refrigerator on your back. The fact of the matter is we're really proud we did this movie. People say it's the best movie they've seen this year. They say, 'Why don't we make more movies like this? 

After the film received seven Academy Awards nominations, Joe Roth said, "Everyone is really proud of the movie. But it's one of those rare times when adults loved a movie, yet they couldn't convince their friends to go see it, any more than we could convince people in marketing the film."

Critical reception
The Insider received some of the best reviews of 1999 and of Michael Mann's career. On Rotten Tomatoes it has a 96% rating based on 137 reviews, with an average rating of 8.10/10. The website's critical consensus reads, "Intelligent, compelling, and packed with strong performances, The Insider is a potent corporate thriller." On Metacritic, it has a score of 84 out of 100, based on reviews from 34 critics, indicating "universal acclaim".  Audiences surveyed by CinemaScore gave the film a grade "A- " on scale of A to F.

Roger Ebert of the Chicago Sun-Times gave the film three and a half out of four stars and praised "its power to absorb, entertain, and anger". Newsweek magazine's David Ansen wrote, "Mann could probably make a movie about needlepoint riveting. Employing a big canvas, a huge cast of superb character actors and his always exquisite eye for composition, he's made the kind of current-events epic that Hollywood has largely abandoned to TV—and shows us how movies can do it better". 

In her review for The New York Times, Janet Maslin praised Russell Crowe as "a subtle powerhouse in his wrenching evocation of Wigand, takes on the thick, stolid look of the man he portrays", and felt that it was "by far Mann's most fully realized and enthralling work". Time magazine's Richard Corliss wrote, "When Crowe gets to command the screen, The Insider comes to roiled life. It's an All the President's Men in which Deep Throat takes center stage, an insider prodded to spill the truth". Rolling Stone magazine's Peter Travers wrote, "With its dynamite performances, strafing wit and dramatic provocation, The Insider offers Mann at his best—blood up, unsanitized, and unbowed". 

However, Entertainment Weekly gave the film a "B" rating and felt that it was "a good but far from great movie because it presents truth telling in America as far more imperiled than it is".

Director Quentin Tarantino included The Insider in his list of top 20 films released since 1992 (the year he became a director).

Accolades

American Film Institute recognition:
 AFI's 100 Years...100 Heroes and Villains:
 Jeffrey Wigand - Nominated Hero
 In 2006, Premiere ranked Crowe's performance #23 of the 100 Greatest Performances of All Time. Eric Roth and Michael Mann won the Humanitas Prize in the Feature Film category in 2000.

Soundtrack

 Other music in the film 
 "Uotaaref Men Elihabek"—Casbah Orchestra
 "Suffocate", "Hot Shots" and "Night Stop"—Curt Sobel
 "Litany"—Arvo Pärt
 "Smokey Mountain Waltz"—Richard Gilks
 "Armenia"—Einstürzende Neubauten
 "Two or Three Things"—David Darling

See also
 Tobacco Master Settlement Agreement
 60 Minutes Brown & Williamson controversy

References

External links

 
 
 
 
 
 

1999 films
1999 drama films
1990s legal films
1990s thriller films
American biographical films
American business films
American legal films
American thriller films
Brown & Williamson
Biographical films about businesspeople
Biographical films about journalists
Procedural films
Films about drugs
Films about freedom of expression
Films about smoking
Films about television
Films about whistleblowing
Films based on newspaper and magazine articles
Films directed by Michael Mann
Films produced by Michael Mann
Films set in Kentucky
Films set in Mississippi
Films set in New York City
Films shot in the Bahamas
Films shot in Indiana
Films shot in Israel
Films shot in Kentucky
Films shot in Mississippi
Films shot in New York City
Films with screenplays by Michael Mann
Films with screenplays by Eric Roth
Drama film soundtracks
Lisa Gerrard albums
Sony Music soundtracks
Spyglass Entertainment films
Touchstone Pictures films
Tobacco in the United States
1990s English-language films
1990s American films